Virendra Swarup (25 July 1923 – 26 February 1980) was an educator and a former chairman of the Uttar Pradesh Legislative Council. He was elected four times as MLC from Kanpur division graduates constituency.

Legacy

The Dr. Virendra Swarup Educational Foundation (VSEF) was established in 1989 in his memory. The Foundation is running 10+2 schools and several other institutions in Kanpur and nearby areas. It is closely associated with Dayanand Shiksha Sansthan, an organisation that manages more than 25 post-graduate and 10+2 colleges all over Uttar Pradesh and [Uttarakhand].

Sources
Dr. Virendra Swarup Institute of Professional Studies
Dr. Virendra Swarup Institute of Computer Studies
Dayanand Academy of Management Studies
Dr. Virendra Swarup Education Centre
Dr. Virendra Swarup 21st Century

People from Kanpur
Indian schoolteachers
Members of the Uttar Pradesh Legislative Council
Chairs of the Uttar Pradesh Legislative Council
1923 births
1980 deaths